Vinod Kumar Bansal or VK Bansal (26 October 1949 – 3 May 2021) was an Indian educationist and the founder of Bansal Classes in Kota, Rajasthan. He made Kota famous throughout India for IIT-JEE entrance exam preparation.

Biography
Bansal Sir was born on 26 October 1949, in the Jhansi district of the state of Uttar Pradesh. His father was a government employee and his mother was a homemaker.

He went to the Indian Institute of Technology, Banaras Hindu University. After completing his education, he worked in a chemical company, J. K. Synthetics, in Kota.

In 1974, Vinod Kumar Bansal was diagnosed with muscular dystrophy, which left him with complete paralysis and physical impairment, which was predicted to shorten his lifespan. In 1983, J. K. Synthetics closed down. The same year, he met G. D. Agrawal of Mumbai, who suggested he start coaching students for the IIT-JEE, i.e., the undergraduate entrance test for the Indian Institutes of Technology. Hence, he started coaching for the IIT-JEE, starting with 8 students at his dining table.

As few of his students managed to clear the JEE in 1991, he founded Bansal Classes.

Pioneer of Entrance Examination Coaching in India 

Kota has since emerged as the principal coaching center in India, with nearly 150,000 students from across India enrolling in the 40 coaching institutes in Kota. In 2017, 39,000 of these students cleared the Joint Entrance Examination (Main) and at least 48 of them were in the top 100.

Death 
Bansal died on 3 May 2021, from a heart attack. He also tested positive for COVID-19 during the COVID-19 pandemic in India which worsened his pre-existing conditions.

According to his son Sameer Bansal, Managing Director of Bansal Classes, VK Bansal was the architect of the coaching industry in Kota.

On the demise of VK Bansal, Naveen Maheshwari, Director of Allen Institute stated, "It was his fresh vision that made a subject like Maths interesting. Lakhs of students will remember his contribution."

References

1949 births
2021 deaths
People from Jhansi
Businesspeople from Uttar Pradesh
Kota district
Deaths from the COVID-19 pandemic in India